The Oak Grove Community House in Oak Grove, Louisiana, also known as Oak Grove Legion Hut, was listed on the National Register of Historic Places in 2016.  The listing includes a Rustic-style Civil Works Administration-built American Legion hut and a park.  The hut was built in 1932–33.

See also 
 National Register of Historic Places listings in West Carroll Parish, Louisiana

References

Clubhouses on the National Register of Historic Places in Louisiana
American Legion buildings
National Register of Historic Places in West Carroll Parish, Louisiana
1933 establishments in Arkansas
Civil Works Administration
Rustic architecture in the United States
Cultural infrastructure completed in 1933
New Deal in Louisiana